Erganagh (likely ) is a small village and townland (of 498 acres) near Castlederg in County Tyrone, Northern Ireland. It is situated in the historic barony of Strabane Lower and the civil parish of Ardstraw. In the 2001 Census it had a population of 366 people. It is within the Strabane District Council area.

References 

Villages in County Tyrone
Civil parish of Ardstraw